Vitali Klitschko vs. Tomasz Adamek, billed as Walka XXI Wieku!, was a heavyweight bout for the WBC heavyweight championship. The fight took place at the Stadion Miejski in Wrocław, Lower Silesian, Poland on September 10, 2011, and was televised via HBO World Championship Boxing. As a part of a split-site doubleheader, the broadcast also featured the Yuriorkis Gamboa vs. Daniel Ponce de León bout taking place at the Boardwalk Hall in Atlantic City, New Jersey, United States. In Poland, the bout was available on Cyfra+ pay-per-view platform, making it the first PPV fight in Polish television history.

Background
Klitschko, expected to dominate, said he would knock out his opponent, who he said had "only grown into the division by eating like a heavyweight". Fritz Sdunek, Klitschko's coach, said his fighter would retire after two or three more fights.

The fight
Klitschko dominated the fight winning every round on the three scorecards before referee Massimo Barrovecchio stepped in 2 minutes, 20 seconds into the tenth round.

Aftermath
Klitschko would make his next defence against Derek Chisora the following February.

Undercard
Confirmed bouts:

Broadcasting

References

External links
Klitschko vs. Adamek Official Fight Card from BoxRec

World Boxing Council heavyweight championship matches
2011 in boxing
Boxing in Poland
Sport in Wrocław
2011 in Polish sport
Boxing on HBO
Klitschko brothers
September 2011 sports events in Europe
Boxing matches